Ivan Melnikov may refer to:

Ivan Melnikov (politician), Russian politician
Ivan Melnikov (baritone) (1832–1906), opera singer
Ivan Melnikov (footballer) (born 1997), Russian football player

See also
Melnikov